Civic Initiative (GRANI; ; Grazhdanskaya initsiativa, GRANI) (Russian for "Facets") is a Russian centre-right political party. From 2018 to 2020, it was known as the Party of Changes (Partiya peremen). The founder of the party is Andrey Nechayev, who served as Minister of Economic Development from 1992 to 1993.

History 
Alexei Kudrin, who took part in the 2011–2013 Russian protests and wished to play the role of mediator between the opposition and the government, created in April 2012 the "Committee for Civil Initiatives", the name for which was invented by Nechayev and liked the former finance minister. However, Nechayev initially planned to create a party together with Kudrin, and he did not mind. Such a project was eventually rejected due to the fact that, after talking with Putin, Kudrin "decided that it was too early to (create) the party, we must confine ourselves to creating a committee." Nechayev, who had already gathered people by that time, nevertheless decided to create a new center-right party.

On July 27, 2012, the beginning of the creation of the party was announced, over the next half of the year, party representations were created in 50 regions. Prior to this, the legislative threshold for the number of parties was reduced from 40 thousand to 500, which greatly facilitated the registration procedure.

After the dissolution of the Union of Right Forces, part of the political spectrum remained free, and on the initiative of Nechayev, a group of like-minded people was again assembled, intending to create a new party with a liberal-democratic ideology.

Since the creation of the organizing committee, the party has often taken part in mass actions ("March of Millions", March against the Dima Yakovlev Law, "Right to Arms" rally, "May 6 Prisoners" rally, "For Free Business" rally, "Peace March ", The rally" For a Green Moscow ", etc.), in 2020 the party participated in the organization of the" March in memory of Boris Nemtsov».

On March 2, 2013, the founding congress of the party was held in the conference room of the Izmailovo hotel, at which the party's manifesto, resolution, party charter was adopted and an application for registration was submitted to the Ministry of Justice. On May 13, 2013 the party was registered.
 
On January 30, 2014, the party nominated the former Deputy Minister of Economy of Russia Ivan Starikov as a candidate for mayor of Novosibirsk. A few days before the vote, Starikov and a number of candidates withdrew from the elections in favor of the Communist Party of the Russian Federation candidate Anatoly Lokot, thanks to which he won. Later Starikov was appointed the representative of Novosibirsk in Moscow in the rank of vice-mayor.

Civic Initiative candidate Yury Vyazov won the early elections for the Head of the Bagansky District of the Novosibirsk Region, held on September 14, 2014, with 46.62% of the vote.

In 2015, the political council of the party included Vladimir Ryzhkov, Dmitry Nekrasov, Maxim Katz, Dmitry Gudkov and Gennady Gudkov. The party made a decision to nominate candidates for deputies of the Legislative Assembly of the Kaluga Region. Among others, the candidates were the party leader Andrey Nechayev and Darya Besedina. As a result, they were not allowed before the elections.

On June 13, 2018, the Moscow branch of the party decided to nominate Dmitry Gudkov as a candidate for mayor of Moscow, but he could not pass the municipal filter, having submitted only 76 signatures out of 110 required to the Moscow City Electoral Commission.

In the 2018 Moscow Oblast gubernatorial election, the party supported the former deputy chairman of the Union of Right Forces faction in the State Duma of the III convocation, candidate Boris Nadezhdin, nominated by the Party of Growth. He got 93,223 votes (4.36%) and came in last place.

The party opposes election fraud, for free enterprise, and the modernization of the economic and social sphere of life, against the health care reform in Moscow, for the legalization of the possession of weapons, the party has strongly condemned the murder of Boris Nemtsov.

Most often, despite the collected signatures for the nomination of municipal deputies, party lists are denied registration from local election commissions under various pretexts. On November 25, 2019, the Ministry of Justice filed a lawsuit with the Supreme Court demanding the suspension of the party's activities.

2016 Russian legislative election 
Civic Initiative tried to unite with Yabloko for the sake of nominating a single list of candidates for the elections to the State Duma, however, due to the fact that the Yabloko people were delaying making a decision on this issue, the party joined forces in the election campaign with another right-wing party - “Party of Growth" The agreement on cooperation was signed by the chairmen of the two parties - business ombudsman Boris Titov and Andrey Nechayev.At the congress, the party approved a federal list of candidates for the September 18 elections, and also nominated candidates in 162 single-mandate constituencies. The federal list includes: Boris Titov, Irina Khakamada, Oksana Dmitriyeva, Dmitry Potapenko, Oleg Nikolaev, Ksenia Sokolova, Natalia Burykina, Andrey Nechayev, Ivan Grachev, Viktor Zvagelsky and Dmitry Porochkin.

Nechayev ran on the federal part of the party list and in the Leningrad single-mandate constituency in Moscow. Anatoly Chubais in his Facebook post called him one of the most professional candidates for the new Duma, and Maxim Katz said that if a good campaign is carried out, Nechayev has a chance to win.Alexei Kudrin also pinned his hopes on the "Party of Growth".

In a single constituency, the party won 679,030 votes (1.29%) and 1,171,259 votes (2.25%) in single-mandate constituencies, thus not holding a single candidate to the State Duma.

Boris Titov believes that the party has conducted the best of all election campaigns. He connects the election result with the existing strong apathy among entrepreneurs and people of liberal views.

Ksenia Sobchak's nomination for the presidential election 
Ksenia Sobchak, declaring that she supports the Civic Initiative program, on December 23, 2017, joined her political council. At the same time, she was nominated by the party as a candidate for the post of President of Russia. Sobchak officially announced her nomination and explained that she considers participation in the elections to be the best legal way to express a protest and that she plans to become a kind of "against all". Nechayev agreed to be nominated with the expectation that the votes gained in the elections will help the party to acquire state funding, and the admission to the air of federal TV channels will increase recognition, also Nechayev was categorically against Sobchak's nomination if it would be "part of the Presidential Administration's election game".

Ksenia's nomination was supported by Mikhail Khodorkovsky, Andrey Makarevich, Vladimir Pozner and Mikhail Kasyanov.

Ksenia's "123 Steps" election program was helped by Vladislav Inozemtsev, director of the Post-Industrial Society Research Center, and Andrey Nechayev, party leader, and Avdotya Smirnova (in the part related to inclusive society and provisions related to this area in the program) and lawyer Elena Lukyanova (provisions related to constitutional reform). In addition to these individuals, Sobchak's campaign headquarters included: one of the founders of the NTVtelevision company Igor Malashenko, who campaigned for Boris Yeltsin in 1996, director of the AIDS.Center Anton Krasovsky (previously headed Mikhail Prokhorov's headquarters), a Belarusian political strategist who worked with the headquarters of the Angela Merkel and Barack Obama, Vitaly Shklyarov, director of external relations of the Snob project Ksenia Chudinova, director Sergei Kalvarsky, former editor-in-chief of the Political News Agency Stanislav Belkovsky, human rights activist Marina Litvinovich, blogger and former member of the Russian Opposition Coordination Council Rustem Adagamov, Timur Valeev (head of the Open Elections project at Mikhail Khodorkovsky's Open Russia) and former VK press secretary Georgy Lobushkin. Also Demyan Kudryavtsev, whose family owned the newspaper Vedomosti, gave Ksenia advices related to the campaign.

On February 13, 2018 it became known that Sergei Kovalev, the first ombudsman for human rights in the Russian Federation, would become the confidant of the candidate Ksenia Sobchak for the presidency, but a day later he refused this, stating that “one should not undertake what is not you know how to do in the best possible way, and in what you do not feel firmly convinced".

The sponsors of the Sobchak campaign were Serguei Adoniev (co-owner of Yota Devices), Alexander Fedotov (president of the publishing house ACMG, which publishes L'Officiel, Forbes, SNC and OK! Magazines in Russia), Vladimir Palikhata (founder of the Legacy Square Capital investment group, Russian publisher of the magazine about entrepreneurship Inc.), Alexander Roslyakov (owner of the Onego Shipping transport company), Vadim and Yana Raskovalovs (owners of the Sportlife sports club network and the Yana jewelry company) and Anatoly Tsybulevsky (founder and co-owner of New Energy Systems).

As a result, in the presidential election (March 18, 2018), candidate Ksenia Sobchak gained 1,238,031 votes or 1.68%, taking 4th place. Her result was the highest among candidates with liberal programs (Yavlinsky - 1.05% and Titov - 0.76%).

Conflict between Ksenia Sobchak and Alexei Navalny 
In an interview with Dozhd, Sobchak announced her readiness to discuss the withdrawal of her candidacy, if Alexei Navalny succeeds in obtaining registration as a candidate. Earlier, before her nomination, Ksenia proposed to Navalny to develop a plan in case he was not registered or his wife Yulia was considered as a possible candidate, but the oppositionist refused both proposals, since the votes of people ready to vote for him, he said, not transferred.

For the first time, Navalny spoke about Sobchak's nomination as follows: "Ksenia Sobchak, being a Russian citizen over 35 years old and not in prison, has every right to nominate her candidacy.". However Navalny would later speak out sharply calling Sobchak "a caricatured liberal candidate with a cannibalistic position," and she, in return, will accuse him of wanting to have a monopoly on opposition.

At a press conference of President Putin, Sobchak spoke about Navalny: “There is a candidate Navalny, who has been campaigning for a year now. Fictitious criminal cases were specially created against him. Their fictitiousness was proven in the European Convention on Human Rights." Navalny praised her for the question, Sobchak, but after the final decision to refuse to register him as a presidential candidate, he called on his voters to boycott the elections, which means Sobchak.

In spite of everything, Ksenia offered Navalny to become her confidant so that he had the opportunity to speak instead of her on TV channels, he refused.

Already on election day, Navalny spoke about Sobchak's visit to his home in the fall of 2017, during which Ksenia, according to him, admitted that she had received an offer of substantial monetary reward for her nomination and participation in the presidential race, but Sobchak rejected accusations of collusion with the authorities. swearing to the health of your child.

Democratic coalition 
Ahead of the September 2015 regional elections, it was announced that the party had become a member of a democratic opposition coalition, which plans to participate with a single list from the People's Freedom Party in six elections in three regions, but the politicians failed to reach an agreement, as a result of which the democratic coalition and the Civil Initiative had to compete in the elections to the Legislative Assembly of the Kaluga Region, but the party was not admitted to them.

In 2016, the party tried to unite with Yabloko for the sake of nominating a single list of candidates for elections to the State Duma, however, due to the fact that Yabloko delayed making a decision on this issue, the party joined forces in the election campaign with the Party of Growth".

Party chairman Andrey Nechayev often tries to unite democratic forces, but this happens very rarely. He spoke about Yavlinsky's inability to negotiate and reproaches Navalny for destroying the democratic coalition.

Party of Changes

On March 13, 2018, Vedomosti reported that Ksenia Sobchak and Dmitry Gudkov would announce on March 15 the creation of a new right-wing party based on the Civic Initiative. From that moment on, the party began to have problems with the Ministry of Justice (which is why the party's rebranding was informal). Gudkov said that the main goal of the project will be to get to State Duma - to win the parliamentary elections in 2021.

At the end of May, Znak.com, citing its sources, said that the congress was postponed from June 3 to autumn, which is due to the position of the presidential administration, which wants to hold a single voting day in 2018 "with a minimum number of scandals and competition."

On May 31, 2018, at a press conference of Gudkov, Sobchak and Nechayev, it became known that the congress would be held on June 23. In addition, Dmitry Gudkov announced his nomination for the 2018 Moscow mayoral election from the party. He said that he had already collected the signatures of municipal deputies and would soon take the signatures to the Moscow City Election Commission or the Mayor's Office..

On June 23, 2018, a founding congress was held, where it was decided to create a new "Party of Changes" on the basis of the "Civil Initiative". Ksenia Sobchak and Dmitry Gudkov were appointed to the top posts of the party. New symbols have appeared, and 15 people entered the new political council, including Gudkov and Sobchak themselves, Andrey Nechayev, former chairman of the Open Russia movement Alexander Solovyov, executive director of Open Russia Timur Valeev, son of Boris Nemtsov Anton, former executive secretary of the Russian Opposition Coordination Council Dmitry Nekrasov, political scientist Marina Litvinovich and lawyer Elena Lukyanova, to the expert council - Minister of Economy in 1994-1997 Yevgeny Yasin, Yevgeny Gontmakher, journalist Nikolai Svanidze, former chairman of the Saint Petersburg regional branch of Yabloko (in 2003-2012) Maxim Reznik and others.

On March 1, 2019, the youth movement "Petersburg - City of Changes!" Was created in St. Petersburg. in order to counteract the activity of the "Party of Changes" in the city in the municipal elections and the election of the governor of St. Petersburg.

In April 2019, it became known that Sobchak had stopped funding the Party of Changes.

Dmitry Gudkov left the party in March 2020, not wanting to interfere with the struggle to preserve the structure. Nechayev became the chairman of the party again, the name remained the same - "Civic Initiative".

Electoral results

President

State Duma

References

External links
Official party site

2013 establishments in Russia
Conservative parties in Russia
Economic liberalism
Liberal conservative parties
Liberal parties in Russia
Political parties established in 2013
Political parties in Russia
Registered political parties in Russia